WUTF-TV (channel 27) is a television station licensed to Worcester, Massachusetts, United States, broadcasting the Spanish-language UniMás network to the Boston area. It is owned by Entravision Communications, which provides certain services to Marlborough-licensed Univision-owned station WUNI (channel 66) under a joint sales agreement (JSA) with TelevisaUnivision. WUTF-TV's studios are located on 4th Avenue, and its transmitter is located on Cedar Street, both in Needham.

History

V66
The station first signed on the air on February 12, 1985 as WVJV-TV (branded as "V-66, the Beat of Boston"), maintaining a music video format at a time when they were a major part of the American culture (this was just four years after MTV launched in August 1981). The station was originally owned by longtime New England radio broadcasters John Garabedian (who later became host of the nationally syndicated radio show Open House Party) and Arnie "Woo-Woo" Ginsburg. Garabedian also owned WGTR (1060 AM, now WQOM); both WVJV and WGTR operated from studios in Natick. The music format combined videos from progressive rock (as heard on WBCN) and pop contemporary (as heard on WXKS-FM). Irrespective of the must-carry rule requiring cable systems to carry the station, many cable systems freely chose to carry WVJV instead of VH1. WVJV was also the first station in the Boston area to transmit in stereo.

Change from music videos to home shopping
Garabedian had hoped to launch a national over-the-air music video network (predating the existence of The Box) to compete against MTV, if WVJV had succeeded. However, although channel 66 received a sizable number of viewers, the station struggled to retain them for long periods of time, and by mid-1986, the station's advertising sales were insufficient to ensure the station's long-term viability; additionally, attempts to broaden the station's programming to include shows on sports and other topics proved unsuccessful. Consequently, WVJV was sold to the HSN later that year, with the station transitioning to HSN's shopping programs soon afterwards on September 21, 1986; a callsign change to WHSH followed the next year. For the next thirteen years, WHSH continued to run HSN programming, with some local feature segments in-between.

A documentary film about V66 titled Life on the V: The Story of V66, produced by Christian de Rezendes and Eric Green, premiered at the Independent Film Festival of Boston on April 29, 2014.

"Hub 66", WHUB-TV
In 1999, Barry Diller, owner of HSN and its broadcast arm USA Broadcasting (formerly Silver King Television), began plans to turn his stations into true independents under the "CityVision" banner. After switching stations in Miami, Atlanta, and Dallas-Fort Worth, this format was implemented in Boston on Channel 66 as WHUB-TV (from Boston's nickname "The Hub"), with the "Hub 66" branding and a main slogan echoing The Standells' "Dirty Water" ("Ahhh, Boston you're our home").
 
The station under the "CityVision" format aired primarily syndicated and first-run programming including sitcom reruns of shows like Cheers and Taxi, drama reruns of shows like Star Trek: The Next Generation, cartoons, and movies under the HubFlix banner. Like other "CityVision" stations, the station also obtained live sports rights specifically Boston University ice hockey games (previously held by WABU/WBPX), as well as the annual Beanpot tournament.

Plans were set to convert the entire chain of USAB stations to the "CityVision" format, but at the end of 2000, USA Broadcasting scrapped all plans and put all its stations up for sale with WHUB reverting to HSN affiliation in the interim period to cut costs. Disney/ABC and Univision Communications were both in the running to become the owner of WHUB with Disney planning on aligning with Hearst-owned ABC affiliate WCVB; however, Univision outbid them in a close race, with plans immediately announced to make the station (and all but three USAB stations) a charter affiliate of what would become Telefutura (originally referred to as Univision Duo and later rebranded as UniMás in 2013); The station's five-month run made it one of the shortest-run independent-formatted stations in the country (a few 1950s UHF independent stations, such as the three-month-long WBES-TV, had shorter).

AT&T Broadband obtained some of WHUB's programming for its AT&T 3 channel including the 2001 Beanpot, (which WHUB never telecast after reverting to HSN; the tournament has since moved to NESN); AT&T 3 would be replaced by CN8 New England in 2003 which, itself, would shut down in January 2009.

Switch to Telefutura/UniMás
To reflect its pending affiliation change, channel 66 changed call letters to WFUB (likely standing for "Telefutura Boston") in November 2001. However, just one month later, the station changed the callsign again to WUTF  with both changes occurring during the interim period of HSN programming. It was not until January 14, 2002, that channel 66 joined Telefutura, offering a general Spanish-language entertainment format with movies, serials, sports and children's programming. Telefutura later rebranded as UniMás on January 7, 2013.

Move to channel 27

On December 4, 2017, as part of a channel swap made by Entravision Communications, WUTF and sister station WUNI swapped channel numbers, with WUTF moving from digital channel 27 and virtual channel 66 to digital channel 29 and virtual channel 27.

Technical information

Subchannels
The station's digital signal is multiplexed:

Analog-to-digital conversion
WUTF shut down its analog signal, over UHF channel 66, on June 12, 2009, the official date in which full-power television stations in the United States transitioned from analog to digital broadcasts under federal mandate. The station moved its digital signal from its pre-transition UHF channel 23 to channel 27. Through the use of PSIP, digital television receivers display the station's virtual channel as its former UHF analog channel 66, which was among the high band UHF channels (52-69) that were removed from broadcasting use as a result of the transition.

Entravision tower 

The Entravision tower is a former television broadcast tower located in Boylston, Massachusetts. The tower is owned by Entravision Communications and formerly broadcast WUNI (Now WUTF) until its move to Needham.

References

External links
 
 http://www.worcestermass.com/dynamix/v66.shtml

Television channels and stations established in 1985
UniMás network affiliates
LATV affiliates
Stadium (sports network) affiliates
TheGrio affiliates
UTF-TV
UTF-TV
1985 establishments in Massachusetts
Entravision Communications stations
Mass media in Worcester, Massachusetts